Blanche I (6 July 1387 – 1 April 1441) was Queen of Navarre from the death of her father, King Charles III, in 1425 until her own death. She had been Queen of Sicily from 1402 to 1409 by marriage to King Martin I, serving as regent of Sicily from 1404 to 1405 and from 1408 to 1415.

Life
Blanche was the second eldest daughter of King Charles III of Navarre and infanta Eleanor of Castile. She became the heiress to the throne of Navarre on the death of her elder sister, Joan, in 1413.

Queen regent of Sicily
Blanche married firstly Martin the Younger, King of Sicily and Prince of Aragon. They were married by proxy on 21 May 1402 in Catania. Blanche traveled to meet Martin, and they were married in person on 26 December 1402. The bride was about 15 years old and the groom 28.

Martin had been in need of legitimate heirs, as he had survived his previous wife and former co-ruler, Queen Maria of Sicily, and their only son. From October 1404 to August 1405, she served as regent of Sicily during the absence of her spouse in Aragon.

From August 1408 to July 1409, she served as regent of Sicily during the absence of her spouse in Sardinia. When Martin died on 25 July 1409, he was succeeded by his own father, Martin I of Aragon. Her former father-in-law allowed her to continue as regent of Sicily, which she did also after his death, during the years of succession struggle in Aragon. She was a popular regent in Sicily, where she was seen as a symbol of Sicilian independence against Aragon, and Bernardo Cabrera made an unsuccessful attempt to abduct her to marry Nicolas Peralta, a descendant of the Sicilian royal house, and thereby restore the Sicilian royal house with her and Nicolas as king and queen.

With the victory of Ferdinand I in Aragon, Blanche lost her regency power in Sicily, which was annexed to Aragon in November 1415, and left for Navarre.

Queen regnant of Navarre

Upon her return to Navarre, Blanche was sworn in as heir to the throne in Olite the 28 October 1415 and was given allegiance by the lords. On 6 November 1419, Blanche married her second husband, John, duke of Peñafiel, the second son of Ferdinand I of Aragon and Eleanor of Alburquerque, by proxy in Olite. Ferdinand had succeeded his maternal uncle Martin I in 1412.

John travelled to meet her. On 10 June 1420, they were married in person in Pamplona. The couple first lived in Peñafiel, but were called to live in Navarre by her father in 1422.

Charles III died on 8 September 1425 and Blanche succeeded him as Queen regnant of Navarre. John became King of Navarre in her right as John II, and the couple were crowned together in Pamplona 15 May 1429.

Blanche died in Santa María la Real de Nieva in 1441. After her death, John kept the government of Navarre in his own hands, from the hands of their own son Charles of Viana, the rightful heir of the line of Navarrese kings. He would become King of Aragon and King of Sicily upon the death of his elder brother Alfonso V of Aragon in 1458.

Issue
Blanche and Martin had one child together:

Infante Martin of Aragon and Sicily (1406–1407)

Blanche and John II of Aragon had four children together:

 Charles (IV) of Navarre (1421–1461)
 Joan of Navarre (142322 August 1425)
 Blanche (II) of Navarre, married Henry IV of Castile. The marriage was never consummated. After 13 years of marriage, Henry sought and obtained a divorce. Blanca was sent home, where her family imprisoned her, and she was later killed by poison.
 Eleanor (1426–1479) Queen of Navarre (1479)

References

Bibliography

 Anthony, Raoul: Identification et Etude des Ossements des Rois de Navarre inhumés dans la Cathédrale de Lescar, Paris, Masson, 1931
 Maria Rita Lo Forte Scirpo: C'era una volta una regina ... : due donne per un regno: Maria d'Aragona e Bianca di Navarra, Napoli : Liguori, 2003
 Blanca I de Navarra in Auñamendi Entziklopedia

External links

1387 births
1441 deaths
14th-century French people
15th-century Sicilian people
14th-century French women
15th-century French people
15th-century French women
15th-century Italian women
15th-century women rulers
15th-century Navarrese monarchs
Remarried royal consorts
House of Évreux
Navarrese infantas
Queens regnant of Navarre
Royal consorts of Sicily
Regents of Sicily
Daughters of kings